Korodougou is a commune in the Cercle of Bla in the Ségou Region of Mali. The principal town lies at Nampasso. In 1998 the commune had a population of 9,618.

References

Communes of Ségou Region